Yo baby is the seventh studio album of South African singer Brenda Fassie released on November 6, 1992 by CCP Records. Lyrically, the album, is composed of songs about love, dancing, getto life and relationships. The album became Fassie highest-selling album, it spawned successful singles such as "Istraight Lendaba", "Boipatong",

In lyrics of the song "Boipatong", Fassie respond to the Boipatong massacre (June 14, 1992), which saw 42 township residents killed, in the song she sends condolences to those who lost their love ones.
On the song "Istraight Le Ndaba", Lyrically  it discussed two situations; Firstly on the song she addressed the issue of jackrolling which was a huge social issue back then and secondly she was telling the people to mind their business specifically the Media and to "let her live her life".

Production

The album had a more pop songs than the first album which incorporated Afropop. The album was produced by Selwyn Shandel , who also produced the  second albums. Fassie served as executive producers of the album.

Release

The album was first released in South Africa on July 27, 1993 by CCP Records. On 20 October 2009, the album was re-released by EMI Music South Africa (Pty) in digital form.

Track list

Personnel

Musicians

Brenda Fassie - Vocals
Tshepo Tshola - Additional Vocals (Track 4)

Production

Brenda Fassie – producer (all tracks), executive producer
Selwyn Shandel - producer

References

External links
Yo Baby

1992 albums
Brenda Fassie albums